Rodrigo Pinto Pizarro Pimentel de Almeida Carvalhais was a Portuguese baron and the President of the Council of Ministers of the Kingdom of Portugal from 18 April to 26 November 1839. He was the 1st Baron of Ribeira de Sabrosa.

References

1788 births
1841 deaths
Naval ministers of Portugal
People from Alijó
Portuguese nobility
Prime Ministers of Portugal
19th-century Portuguese people
Barons of Portugal